Nazário do Carmo or Nazário (born November 9, 1992) is an East Timorese football player. He has played as defender for the Timor-Leste national football team.

References

External links

1992 births
Living people
East Timorese footballers
East Timorese men's futsal players
Association football defenders
Timor-Leste international footballers
A.D. Dili Leste players